Escape from Broadmoor is a 1948 British short film featuring John Le Mesurier, in one of his earliest screen appearances. He plays Pendicost, a man escaped from an asylum, whom police are hunting down. The title is a reference to Broadmoor high-security psychiatric hospital in Crowthorne, Berkshire. It was the last film appearance of Victoria Hopper who had been a prominent leading lady in the 1930s.

Plot
An insane killer escapes from Broadmoor Hospital, and returns to the scene of a decade old crime, where the ghost of a servant girl he killed is bent on revenge.

Cast
 John Stuart as Inspector Thornton
 Victoria Hopper as Susan
 John Le Mesurier as Pendicost
 Frank Hawkins as Roger Trent
 Tony Doonan as Jenkins
 Gillie Fenwick as Sandy

References

External links
 

1948 films
British drama short films
Films directed by John Gilling
Films set in psychiatric hospitals
British black-and-white films
1948 drama films
1940s English-language films
1940s British films